Tarik Evre (born 29 May 1996) is a Dutch football player of Turkish descent who currently plays for the Jong team of NEC Nijmegen. He also holds Turkish citizenship and represented Turkey on junior levels.

Club career
He played 9 years in the Vitesse youth academy and made his professional debut in the Eredivisie for PEC Zwolle on 27 February 2016 in a game against SC Cambuur. Evre suffered a heavy injury during an October 2016 match with Zwolle's reserves.

In September 2019, Evre joined NEC Nijmegen to play for the clubs Jong team.

References

External links
 
 

1996 births
Living people
Sportspeople from Amersfoort
Dutch people of Turkish descent
Association football defenders
Dutch footballers
PEC Zwolle players
Eredivisie players
Tweede Divisie players
Footballers from Utrecht (province)